Anna Rosenwasser (born 1 May 1990) is a Swiss journalist, editorialist, and political and pro-LGBTQ-activist. She came to public fame in Switzerland through her commitment to LGBT rights, especially same-sex marriage. She is a public critic of homophobia and discrimination or sexual minorities.

Career 
Born to a Swiss mother and an Israeli father, Rosenwasser studied journalism at ZHAW Winterthur, as well as political science and modern history at the University of Zurich.

She has been working as a freelance journalist since 2008, writing columns for publications such as hellozurich, SAITEN, and Mannschaft Magazin. She served for several years on the board of Milchjugend, the largest Swiss LGBTQ youth group. In 2017, she co-founded the Schaffhausen LGBTQ youth group andersh, which she went on to lead. Anna Rosenwasser was also co-managing director of the lesbian organisation Schweiz LOS from 2017 to 2021.

In 2018, Rosenwasser was nominated for the LGBT+ Award of the Swiss Diversity Awards. In 2019, she ran for the National Council as second place on the Socialist Youth (JUSO) list.

In 2021, she co-authored the book Queer Sex - Whatever the fuck you want with politician Florian Vock and illustrator Claudio Näf.

Rosenwasser was involved in the debates of the 2018 Referendum on widening antiracist penal norms, as well as in the 2021 introduction of same-sex marriage in Switzerland. She thus came to international prominence, with her activity coming to the notice of the Spiegel and the BBC.

Bibliography 
 Anna Rosenwasser, Florian Vock and Claudio Näf: Queer Sex - Whatever the fuck you want. Print Matters, Zürich 2021, ISBN 978-3-033-08178-9

Sources and references

References

External links 
 
 SRF: Anna Rosenwasser bei Gredig Direkt,. Retrieved 26 May 2021.
 SRF: Anna Rosenwasser im  Literaturclub. Retrieved 8 November 2021.
 Ein Gespräch mit Anna Rosenwasser: «Nach dem Coming-out sang die ganze Klasse ‹Happy Birthday›». Retrieved 8 November 2021.

Press 
 Interview mit Anna Rosenwasser in der NZZ am Sonntag: «Sprache ist ein Spielplatz!» – «Das Gendersternchen ist unästhetisch!» Eine Debatte zwischen einer jungen Frau und einem älteren Mann. Retrieved 8 November 2021.
 Gastbeitrag von Anna Rosenwasser im Tagesanzeiger: Wie soll meine Tochter mit Sexismus umgehen? Retrieved 8 November 2021.
 Finanz und Wirtschaft: Kaffee ... mit Anna Rosenwasser. Retrieved 8 November 2021.
 Gastkommentar von Anna Rosenwasser in der NZZ: Oh boy, dieses Gendern! Retrieved 8 November 2021.
 SRF Diskussion mit Anna Rosenwasser: Was soll man sagen – Macht, Moral und Cancel Culture. Retrieved 8 November 2021.

Swiss LGBT rights activists
Swiss journalists
1990 births
Living people